Sarthal valley is a tourist destination in Kathua district of Jammu and Kashmir (union territory) in India. This valley covers snow for six months and is covered with snow clad mountains. This area is connecting Bhaderwah on North and Himachal Pradesh on West.

Demographics
This tourist destination is situated in Kathua district of Jammu and Kashmir (union territory) in India. It is covered by mountains from all sides and for the few months people from Gujjars community live there for some months and migrate to lower lands of Kathua during winters. Because the region gets heavy snowfall which remain almost for 6 months. 

This area's common herbaceous flora are Primula denticulata, Bergenia ciliata, Gentiana indica, Sinopodophyllum hexandrum, Barbarea intermedia, Potentilla sterilis, Anaphaslis busua and Logularia amplexocaulis. Various rivers originates from the hills and mountains of Sarthal including Sewa, Ravi and Ujh river and all these are covered with Riverine forests.

References

Jammu and Kashmir